Black Dresses are a Canadian noise pop duo consisting of Ada Rook and Devi McCallion. Their debut album, Wasteisolation, was released independently in 2018. The duo released three additional albums, Thank You (2019), Love and Affection for Stupid Little Bitches (2019), and Peaceful as Hell (2020), before breaking up in 2020. Despite no longer being a band, Black Dresses have released two additional albums, Forever in Your Heart (2021) and Forget Your Own Face (2022).

History

2018-2019: Wasteisolation, Thank You, and Love and Affection for Stupid Little Bitches
Black Dresses was formed in 2017 by self-taught musicians Ada Rook and Devi McCallion after Rook sent McCallion a beat on Twitter. They released their first single, a cover of M.I.A.'s "Paper Planes", in December 2017.

The duo released their debut album, Wasteisolation, in April 2018. The album was created entirely through online collaboration, with McCallion based in Toronto and Rook in Vancouver. Wasteisolation received positive coverage by Noisey, Stereogum and The Fader who called it "a raw, abrasive, and deliriously catchy album about surviving as trans women in an antagonistic world." This was followed shortly by the EP Hell Is Real, released in October of the same year. The EP featured in Stereogums Best EPs of 2018 list, with the duo also featuring in the publication's list of best new artists.

In February 2019, Black Dresses released their second studio album, Thank You. In May, they released Dreams Come True 2019, a remix EP consisting of new versions of several Wasteisolation tracks. The band released their third studio album, Love and Affection for Stupid Little Bitches in August 2019. The album was reviewed positively, with Pitchforks Colin Joyce awarding an album a rating of 7.7, and Noisey including the record on its "22 Best Albums You May Have Missed in 2019" list.

2020: Peaceful as Hell and breakup
In March 2020, a full-length animated video for the Wasteisolation track "Nausea" was released. On 13 April 2020, the second anniversary of Wasteisolations release, Black Dresses released their fourth LP, Peaceful as Hell. The album received a rating of 7.6 from Pitchfork, with Leah Mandel stating, "Especially with the world's hellishness currently blaring at us, every social disparity spotlighted and exacerbated, loneliness and doubt deepened to an extreme degree, Peaceful as Hell is perfect medicine".

The duo announced via Twitter on May 26, 2020, that Black Dresses would be disbanding, citing the harassment received by McCallion as the reason. The band's music was also temporarily taken off streaming services. On 10 July 2020, after the duo disbanded, a remix of 100 Gecs song, "745 Sticky", was released on the remix album 1000 Gecs and the Tree of Clues. On 21 December 2020, the duo released a single with ESPer99 titled "World Peace", recorded in 2019. McCallion and Rook also continued to release solo music under the names Girls Rituals and Ada Rook respectively.

2021-present: Forever In Your Heart and Forget Your Own Face
On February 14, 2021, the duo released their fifth studio album, Forever in Your Heart, announcing it 30 minutes prior to its release. Despite the release, the group stated "We're no longer a band unfortunately. Regardless, we've decided to keep putting out music." Ten days later, Backxwash announced the tracklist for her album I Lie Here Buried with My Rings and My Dresses, which was to feature Rook and McCallion on separate tracks, although after tracklist changes McCallion did not appear on the album.

In August 2021, Black Dresses' music returned to streaming services. In December 2021, Black Dresses appeared on the holiday compilation album Christmasasaurus X2 with their version of the song "We Are Children of the Light" by Eugene O'Reilley.

On February 14, 2022, the duo released their sixth studio album, Forget Your Own Face, exactly one year after their previous album released, to overall positive reception. Hannah Jocelyn on Pitchfork stated: "For a band that often writes about internalized shame and self-loathing, the resentment at the heart of this record feels more outwardly pointed." On September 30, 2022, the duo released a cover of the Scene Queen's "Pink Panther".

Band members and solo work

Ada Rook

Rook releases music under her own name, as well as her side project crisis sigil. She is also a member of the duo rook&nomie in addition to Black Dresses. In 2022, Ada Rook released an album titled Ugly Death No Redemption Angel Curse I Love You, featuring ESPer99. The album was reviewed by Anthony Fantano, who gave it a 7/10 score. The album includes samples of the 2007 anime Ice. Ada Rook and Ash Nerve created a duo group, Angel Electronics in 2022, releasing a nine song EP, Ultra Paradise, in 2023.

Devi McCallion
McCallion has released music online since at least 2006, under her own name as well as several different aliases. She released her first album 1998 under the alias 'EAT BABIES' in 2006, and released Meow in 2011.

As Girls Rituals, she has released five studio albums, Reddishness (2015), EMERGENCY! (2017), "I'm Desperate" (2018), "Crap Shit" (2020), and "Cow" (2021). McCallion also has 2 albums under the alias 'Cats Millionaire': Fun Fun Fun (2013), and I'm So Sorry (2012). She also created two collaboration albums with Katie Dey: Some New Form of Life (2018), and Magic Fire Brain (2020).

She has been a member of several side-projects over the years, including "The Various Endeavors?", where she was listed as an official member of the band alongside longtime friend and collaborator, John Bevier [visual-artist/experimental-musician]. 
She co-produced most of the band's music from 2007 to 2010. She is seen pictured and cartoon-depicted on the project's bandcamp page.

She is also a member of 'Anarchy 99' with So Drove, which has released one studio album, Rockstar Super Heat (2021).

Discography

Albums
 Wasteisolation (2018)
 Thank You (2019)
 Love and Affection for Stupid Little Bitches (2019)
 Peaceful as Hell (2020)
 Forever in Your Heart (2021)
 Forget Your Own Face (2022)

EPs
 Lethal Poison for the System (2017) 
 Hell Is Real (2018)
 Dreams Come True 2019 (2019)

References

Noise pop musical groups
Musical groups from Toronto
Canadian experimental musical groups
Musical groups established in 2017
Musical groups disestablished in 2020
Canadian women in electronic music
Transgender women musicians
2017 establishments in Canada
Female musical duos
Transgender musicians